Brachinites are a group of meteorites that are classified either as primitive achondrites or as asteroidal achondrites. Like all primitive achondrites, they have similarities with chondrites and achondrites. Brachinites contain 74 to 98% (volume) olivine.

Naming and history
Brachinites are named after the Brachina meteorite, the type specimen of this group, which in turn is named after Brachina, South Australia.

Description
Brachinites consist almost entirely of olivine (74 to 98% by volume). Other minerals include plagioclase (6.7 to 12.9%), iron sulfides (1.8 to 4.0%), clinopyroxene (1.5 to 8.2%) and orthopyroxene (0 to 2.4%). Trace minerals include phosphates and meteoritic iron. The only deviation from chondrites is the very high olivine/orthopyroxene ratio.

Specimens
As of 2022, there were 56 meteorites classified as brachinites. A notable example is the type specimen, the Brachina meteorite.

See also
 Glossary of meteoritics

References

Achondrite meteorites
Asteroidal achondrites